Giovanni Matteo Marchetti (1647–1704) was a Roman Catholic prelate who served as Bishop of Arezzo (1691–1704).

Biography
Giovanni Matteo Marchetti was born in Pistoia, Italy on 18 February 1647. On 19 December 1691, he was appointed during the papacy of Pope Innocent XII as Bishop of Arezzo. On 30 December 1691, he was consecrated bishop by Bandino Panciatici, Cardinal-Priest of San Pancrazio, with Prospero Bottini, Titular Archbishop of Myra, and Stefano Giuseppe Menatti, Titular Bishop of Cyrene, serving as co-consecrators. He served as Bishop of Arezzo until his death in September 1704.

References

17th-century Italian Roman Catholic bishops
18th-century Italian Roman Catholic bishops
Bishops appointed by Pope Innocent XII
1647 births
1704 deaths